Longjing Subdistrict is a subdistrict of Youjiang District, Baise, Guangxi, China, before June 21st 2005 called Nabi Township, and locally known as  which means Duck Field Village.

Demographics
Longjing Subdistrict's population was 49,000 (2010). 80% of the people belong to the Zhuang ethnic group, and speak Youjiang Zhuang(). Others include Han who speak Pinghua.

References

Towns and townships in Baise
Subdistricts of the People's Republic of China